The Christmas Show 2004 is a live recording of Gandalf Murphy and the Slambovian Circus of Dreams' December 17, 2004 Holiday show at the Towne Crier Cafe in Pawling, New York. This is a Bootleg Series album, which means that it is generally only sold at live shows, and only during the Holiday season. This album was originally released in 2005, but was remastered and re-released with two bonus tracks in December 2007.

This is a two disc album which contains the full Holiday Show, both songs and the between songs banter. It does a good job of capturing the quirky humor of a live Circus show.

Track listing

Disc one
"Introduction by Phil Ciganer" – 1:50
"Circus of Dreams" – 4:58
"Greetings and Intro to next song" – :57
"Silver Bells" – 2:50
"talkin..." – 1:52
"Sunday in the Rain" – 4:36
"banter and intro" – 3:13
"Broken Heart" – 5:24
"intro to Yodel" – 2:13
"The Yodel Song" – 7:22
"Intro to..." - 2:08
"Flapjacks from the Sky" - 7:19
"Tinkie banter" - 3:25
"Glide" - 4:10
"Intro to Moondog" - 1:17
"Moondog House" - 3:50
"Slambovia" (bonus on 2007 re-release) - 4:37

Disc two
"Little Drummer Boy / Silent Revolution" – 7:11
"Intro to Bike" – 2:54
"Bike" – 5:11
"Banter...Intro to Sullivan" – 1:39
"Sullivan Lane" – 4:16
"Intro to Movin' On" – :58
"Movin' On" – 1:43
"Big 8 Wheeler" – 5:20
"Story about 2 Marionette Shows" – 5:19
"The Christmas Song" – 3:37
"Intro to .." – 1:04
"Her Own World" - 4:02
"Intro to ..." - 2:10
"Talkin' to the Buddha" - 9:24
"Intro to..." - 1:37
"Alice in Space" - 5:15
"Encore Applause / Intro to ... " - 1:16
"Suddenly It's Christmas" - 5:25
"Angels/Gloria" (bonus on 2007 re-release)- 5:04

See also
 

Gandalf Murphy and the Slambovian Circus of Dreams albums
2005 live albums